Amia Srinivasan (born 20 December 1984) is a philosopher. Since January 2020, she has been Chichele Professor of Social and Political Theory at the University of Oxford.

Early life and education 
Srinivasan was born on 20 December 1984 in Bahrain to Indian parents and later lived in Taiwan, Singapore, New York, and London. She studied for an undergraduate degree in philosophy at Yale University, graduating with a Bachelor of Arts (BA) degree summa cum laude in 2007. This was followed by postgraduate Bachelor of Philosophy (BPhil) and Doctor of Philosophy (DPhil) degrees as a Rhodes Scholar at Corpus Christi College, University of Oxford. Her BPhil was completed in 2009 with a thesis titled "Armchair Philosophy & Experimental Philosophy"; this was supervised by John Hawthorne. She completed her DPhil in 2014 with a thesis titled The Fragile Estate: Essays on Luminosity, Normativity and Metaphilosophy: her doctoral supervisors were John Hawthorne and Timothy Williamson.

Academic career
In 2009, she was elected as a prize fellow at All Souls College, Oxford. In 2015, she was appointed as a lecturer in philosophy at University College London (UCL). In 2016, she was awarded a Leverhulme Research Fellowship for the project "At the Depths of Believing". She has held visiting fellowships at the University of California, Los Angeles, Yale University, and New York University. 

In October 2018, Srinivasan joined St John's College, Oxford as a tutorial fellow in philosophy. She was additionally an associate professor of philosophy in the Faculty of Philosophy, University of Oxford from 2018 to 2019. In September 2019, she was announced as the next Chichele Professor of Social and Political Theory at All Souls College, Oxford: she took up the appointment on 1 January 2020. She is the first woman and the first person of color to occupy this position.

She is an associate editor of the philosophy journal Mind and a contributing editor of the London Review of Books. In 2021, Srinivasan published a collection of essays titled The Right to Sex.

Bibliography

References 

|-

1984 births
21st-century American essayists
21st-century Indian philosophers
21st-century American non-fiction writers
21st-century American philosophers
Academics of University College London
Alumni of Corpus Christi College, Oxford
American people of Indian descent
American Rhodes Scholars
American women essayists
Analytic philosophers
Chichele Professors of Social and Political Theory
Connecticut Democrats
Epistemologists
Fellows of All Souls College, Oxford
Lecturers
Living people
Metaphilosophers
Metaphysicians
Metaphysics writers
The New Yorker people
Ontologists
Philosophers of social science
Philosophy academics
Political philosophers
Social philosophers
Yale University alumni
American women academics
21st-century American women writers
Fellows of St John's College, Oxford